Schloss Moritzburg is a Schloss (palace) in Zeitz on the White Elster in the Burgenlandkreis in Saxony-Anhalt. The present baroque building dates from the 17th century and was previously a royal palace and fortified seat of a bishop. Zeitz Cathedral is also located on the site.

History 
In connection with the foundation of the Archbishopric of Magdeburg in 967 the diocese of Zeitz was founded as an auxiliary bishopric in 968 by Otto I. 

Castles in Saxony-Anhalt
Burgenlandkreis